Jack Sheehan may refer to:

 John J. Sheehan (born 1940), United States Marine Corps general
 Jack Sheehan (baseball) (1893–1987), baseball player
 Jack Sheehan (footballer) (1890–1933), Australian rules footballer